The Amur paradise flycatcher (Terpsiphone incei) is a bird species in the family Monarchidae.
It is native to China, Manchuria and Primorsky Krai in the Russian Far East. It is a winter migrant to Southeast Asia. Until 2015, it was considered as a subspecies of the Asian paradise flycatcher.

References

Amur paradise flycatcher
Birds of China
Birds of Manchuria
Amur paradise flycatcher